Borealea sanamyanae is a species of sea slug, an aeolid nudibranch, a marine heterobranch mollusc in the family Flabellinidae.

Distribution
Borealea sanamyanae was described from a single specimen dredged in 17 m depth Matua Island, Middle Kurile Islands, North West Pacific Ocean.

References

Flabellinidae
Gastropods described in 2017